Røyknes is a village in Vennesla municipality in Agder county, Norway. The municipal border between Vennesla and Iveland is the river which is adjacent to the village. Røyknes has about 100 inhabitants.

Røyknes is also the terminal station of the Setesdal Line heritage railway which runs northwest from the village of Grovane.

References

Villages in Agder
Vennesla